Nitin Bali (1971–2018) was an Indian singer, known for his redux version of Bollywood songs.

Biography
Nitin Bali was born in 1971. He was known for singing the redux version of Bollywood songs including Neele Neele Ambar Par, Chhukar Mere Man Ko, Ek Ajanbee Haseena Se and Pal Pal Dil Ke Paas. His debut album Na Jaana was release in 1998 by BMG Crescendo. He than released 6 more albums. He recorded his last song for the 2012 Hindi film Life Ki Toh Lag Gayi.

He died on 9 October 2018 in Mumbai after a car accident.

Personal life
Bali was married to actress and host Ruby Bhatia. After divorce, he was married to actress Roma Bali in 2002.

Albums
Na Jaane (1998)
Baliwood (2002)
Baliwood 2 (2003)
Balimix (2003)
Akkha Nal Akkhian (2016)

References

External links
 
  

1971 births
2018 deaths